QTR may refer to:
 Bell Boeing Quad TiltRotor, a type of aircraft
 Fiscal quarter, in finance
 ICAO designator for Qatar Airways, a Qatari airline
 Q code, a radiotelegraphy message code
 Quick Tire Removal Wheel, a wheel rim used for large mining trucks

See also 
 Quarter (disambiguation)